Lyceum Club may refer to:
International Association of Lyceum Clubs, a club for women artists and writers, founded in London
The Lyceum, Liverpool, a neoclassical listed building in England
Lyceum Club (Dallas), an American women's club
Lyceum Club (Australia), a women's arts, literature and social activism group